John Wesley Powell (March 24, 1834 – September 23, 1902) was an American geologist, U.S. Army soldier, explorer of the American West, professor at Illinois Wesleyan University, and director of major scientific and cultural institutions. He is famous for his 1869 geographic expedition, a three-month river trip down the Green and Colorado rivers, including the first official U.S. government-sponsored passage through the Grand Canyon.

Powell was appointed by US President James A. Garfield to serve as the second director of the U.S. Geological Survey (1881–1894) and proposed, for development of the arid West, policies that were prescient for his accurate evaluation of conditions. Two years prior to his service as director of the U.S. Geological Survey, Major Powell had become the first director of the Bureau of Ethnology at the Smithsonian Institution where he supported linguistic and sociological research and publications.

Biography

Early life 
Powell was born in Mount Morris, New York, in 1834, the son of Joseph and Mary Powell. His father, a poor itinerant preacher, had emigrated to the U.S. from Shrewsbury, England, in 1831. His family moved westward to Jackson, Ohio, then to Walworth County, Wisconsin, before settling in rural Boone County, Illinois.

As a young man he undertook a series of adventures through the Mississippi River valley. In 1855, he spent four months walking across Wisconsin. During 1856, he rowed the Mississippi from St. Anthony, Minnesota, to the sea. In 1857, he rowed down the Ohio River from Pittsburgh to the Mississippi River, traveling north to reach St. Louis. In 1858, he rowed down the Illinois River, then up the Mississippi and the Des Moines River to central Iowa. In 1859, at age 25, he was elected to the Illinois Natural History Society.

Education
Powell studied at Illinois College, Illinois Institute (which would later become Wheaton College), and Oberlin College, over a period of seven years while teaching, but was unable to attain his degree. During his studies Powell acquired a knowledge of Ancient Greek and Latin. Powell had a restless nature and a deep interest in the natural sciences. This desire to learn about natural sciences was against the wishes of his father, yet Powell was still determined to do so. In 1861 when Powell was on a lecture tour he decided that a civil war was inevitable; he decided to study military science and engineering to prepare himself for the imminent conflict.

Civil War and aftermath
Powell's loyalties remained with the Union and the cause of abolishing slavery. On May 8, 1861, he enlisted at Hennepin, Illinois, as a private in the 20th Illinois Infantry. He was elected sergeant-major of the regiment, and when the 20th Illinois was mustered into the Federal service a month later, Powell was commissioned a second lieutenant. He enlisted in the Union Army as a cartographer, topographer and military engineer.

While stationed at Cape Girardeau, Missouri, he recruited an artillery company that became Battery 'F' of the 2nd Illinois Light Artillery, with Powell as captain. On November 28, 1861, Powell took a brief leave to marry Emma Dean. At the Battle of Shiloh, he lost most of his right arm when struck by a Minié ball while in the process of giving the order to fire. The raw nerve endings in his arm caused him pain for the rest of his life.

Despite the loss of an arm, he returned to the Army and was present at the battles of Champion Hill, Big Black River Bridge, and in the siege of Vicksburg. Always the geologist, he took to studying rocks while in the trenches at Vicksburg. He was made a major and commanded an artillery brigade with the 17th Army Corps during the Atlanta campaign. After the fall of Atlanta he was transferred to George H. Thomas' army and participated in the battle of Nashville. At the end of the war he was made a brevet lieutenant colonel but preferred to use the title of "major".

After leaving the Army, Powell took the post of professor of geology at Illinois Wesleyan University. He also lectured at Illinois State Normal University for most of his career. Powell helped expand the collections of the Museum of the Illinois State Natural History Society, where he served as curator. He declined a permanent appointment in favor of exploration of the American West.

Geologic research

Expeditions

After 1867, Powell led a series of expeditions into the Rocky Mountains and around the Green and Colorado rivers. One of these expeditions was with his students and his wife, to collect specimens all over Colorado. Powell, William Byers, and five other men were the first white men to climb Longs Peak in 1868.

In 1869, he set out to explore the Colorado River and the Grand Canyon. Gathering ten men, four boats and food for 10 months, he set out from Green River, Wyoming, on May 24. Passing through dangerous rapids, the group passed down the Green River to its confluence with the Colorado River (then also known as the Grand River upriver from the junction), near present-day Moab, Utah, and completed the journey on August 30, 1869.

The members of the first Powell expedition were:
 John Wesley Powell, trip organizer and leader, major in the Civil War
 John Colton "Jack" Sumner, hunter, trapper, soldier in the Civil War
 William H. Dunn, hunter, trapper from Colorado
 Walter H. Powell, captain in the Civil War, John's brother
 George Y. Bradley, lieutenant in the Civil War, expedition chronicler
 Oramel G. Howland, printer, editor, hunter
 Seneca Howland, soldier who was wounded in the Battle of Gettysburg
 Frank Goodman, Englishman, adventurer
 W.R. Hawkins, cook, soldier in Civil War
 Andrew Hall, Scotsman, the youngest of the expedition

The expedition's route traveled through the Utah canyons of the Colorado River, which Powell described in his published diary as having

Frank Goodman quit after the first month, and Dunn and the Howland brothers left at Separation Canyon in the third month. This was just two days before the group reached the mouth of the Virgin River on August 30, after traversing almost . The three disappeared; some historians have speculated they were killed by the Shivwits Band of Paiutes or by Mormons in the town of Toquerville.

Powell retraced part of the 1869 route in 1871–72 with another expedition that traveled the Colorado River from Green River, Wyoming to Kanab Creek in the Grand Canyon. Powell used three photographers on this expedition;  Elias Olcott Beaman, James Fennemore, and John K. Hillers. This trip resulted in photographs (by John K. Hillers), an accurate map and various papers. At least one Powell scholar, Otis R. Marston, noted the maps produced from the survey were impressionistic rather than precise. In planning this expedition, he employed the services of Jacob Hamblin, a Mormon missionary in southern Utah who had cultivated relationships with Native Americans. Before setting out, Powell used Hamblin as a negotiator to ensure the safety of his expedition from local Indian groups.

After the Colorado
In 1881, Powell was appointed the second director of the U.S. Geological Survey, a post he held until his resignation in 1894, being replaced by Charles Walcott. In 1875, Powell published a book based on his explorations of the Colorado, originally titled Report of the Exploration of the Columbia River of the West and Its Tributaries. It was revised and reissued in 1895 as The Exploration of the Colorado River and Its Canyons. In 1889, the intellectual gatherings Powell hosted in his home were formalized as the Cosmos Club. The club has continued, with members elected to the club for their contributions to scholarship and civic activism.

In the early 1900s the journals of the expedition crew began to be published starting with Dellenbaugh's A Canyon Voyage in 1908, followed in 1939 by the diary of Almon Harris Thompson, who was married to Powell's sister, Ellen Powell Thompson. Bishop, Steward, W.C. Powell, and Jones' diaries were all published in 1947. These diaries made it clear Powell's writings contained some exaggerations and recounted activities that occurred on the second river trip as if they occurred on the first. They also revealed that Powell, who had only one arm, wore a life jacket, though the other men did not have them.

Anthropological research

Powell became the director of the Bureau of Ethnology at the Smithsonian Institution in 1879 and remained so until his death. Under his leadership, the Smithsonian published an influential classification of North American Indian languages. In 1898, Powell was elected a member of the American Antiquarian Society.

As an ethnologist and early anthropologist, Powell was a follower of Lewis Henry Morgan. He classified human societies into 'savagery', 'barbarism', and 'civilization'. Powell's criteria were based on consideration of adoption of technology, family and social organization, property relations, and intellectual development. In his view, all societies were to progress toward civilization. Powell is credited with coining the word "acculturation", first using it in an 1880 report by the U.S. Bureau of American Ethnography. In 1883, Powell defined "acculturation" as psychological changes induced by cross-cultural imitation.

Powell published extensive anthropological studies on the Ute people inhabiting the canyon lands around the Colorado River. His views towards these populations, along with his scientific approach, was built on social Darwinist thought; he focused on defining what features distinguished Native Americans as 'barbaric', placing them above 'savagery' but below 'civilized' white Europeans. Indeed, the study of ethnology was a way for scientists to demarcate social categories in order to justify government-sponsored programs that exploited newly appropriated land and its inhabitants. Powell advocated for government funding to be used to 'civilize' Native American populations, pushing for the teaching of English, Christianity, and Western methods of farming and manufacture.

In his book The Exploration of the Canyons of the Colorado, Powell is motivated to conduct ethnologic studies because "these Indians are more nearly in their primate condition than any others on the continent with whom I am acquainted." As Wallace Stegner posits in Beyond the 100th Meridian, by 1869, many Native American tribes had been pushed to extinction, and those that were known were considered corrupted by intercultural exchange. Even in 1939, Julian Steward, an anthropologist compiling photographs from Powell's 1873 expedition suggested that: "Fascinated at finding [Native Americans] nearly untouched by civilization, he developed a deep interest in ethnology ... Few explorers in the United States have had a comparable opportunity to study and photograph Indians so nearly in their aboriginal state."

Powell created Illinois State University's first Museum of Anthropology which at the time was called the finest in all of North America. Powell held a post as lecturer on the History of Culture in the Political Science department at the Columbian University in Washington, D.C. from 1894 to 1899. Powell's contribution to anthropology and scientific racism is not well known in the geosciences, however a recent article revisited Powell's legacy in terms of his social and political impact on Native Americans.

Environmentalism 
In Cadillac Desert, Powell is portrayed as a champion of land preservation and conservation. Powell's expeditions led to his belief that the arid West was not suitable for agricultural development, except for about 2% of the lands that were near water sources. His Report on the Lands of the Arid Regions of the United States proposed irrigation systems and state boundaries based on watershed areas to avoid disagreements between states. For the remaining lands, he proposed conservation and low-density, open grazing.

The railroad companies owned  – vast tracts of lands granted in return for building the railways – and did not agree with Powell's views on land conservation. They aggressively lobbied Congress to reject Powell's policy proposals and to encourage farming instead, as they wanted to cash in on their lands. The U.S. Congress went along and developed legislation that encouraged pioneer settlement of the American West based on agricultural use of land. Politicians based their decisions on a theory of Professor Cyrus Thomas who was a protege of Horace Greeley. Thomas suggested that agricultural development of land would change climate and cause higher amounts of precipitations, claiming that 'rain follows the plow', a theory which has since been largely discredited.

At an 1893 irrigation conference, Powell would prophetically remark: "Gentlemen, you are piling up a heritage of conflict and litigation over water rights, for there is not sufficient water to supply the land." Powell's recommendations for development of the West were largely ignored until after the Dust Bowl of the 1920s and 1930s, resulting in untold suffering associated with pioneer subsistence farms that failed because of insufficient rain and irrigation water.

Legacy, honors, and namesakes

In recognition of his national service, Powell was buried in Arlington National Cemetery, Virginia. The John D. Dingell, Jr. Conservation, Management, and Recreation Act, signed 12 March 2019, authorizes the establishment of the "John Wesley Powell National Conservation Area", consisting of approximately 29,868 acres of land in Utah. Green River, Wyoming, the embarkation site of both Powell expeditions, commissioned a statue depicting Powell holding an oar, in front of the Sweetwater County History Museum. In Powell's honor, the USGS National Center in Reston, Virginia, was dedicated as the "John Wesley Powell Federal Building" in 1974. In addition, the highest award presented by the USGS to persons outside the federal government is named the John Wesley Powell Award. In 1984, he was inducted into the Hall of Great Westerners of the National Cowboy & Western Heritage Museum.

The following were named after Powell:
 The rare mineral powellite.
 Lake Powell, a man-made reservoir on the Colorado River.
 Mount Powell, a summit in the Sierra Nevada of California.
 Powell Peak.
 Powell Plateau, near Steamboat Mountain on the North Rim of the Grand Canyon.
 Powell, Wyoming, and the Powell Flats area.
 The residential building of the Criminal Justice Services Department of Mesa County in Grand Junction, Colorado.
 John Wesley Powell Middle School in Littleton, Colorado.
 Powell Junior High School in Mesa, Arizona.

Awards 
An article in Scientific American notes the following awards:
 1886 – Honorary Ph.D. from University of Heidelberg on 500th anniversary
 1886 – Honorary LL.D. from Harvard University on 230th anniversary
 elected to National Academy of Sciences
 president of Anthropological Society of Washington 1879–1888
 1884 – president of Philosophical Society of Washington
 1874 – elected member and fellow of American Association for the Advancement of Science (AAAS)
 1875 – vice president of AAAS

Personal life 
On November 28, 1861, while serving as captain of Battery 'F' of the 2nd Illinois Light Artillery at Cape Girardeau, Missouri, he took a brief leave to marry Emma Dean.

On September 10, 1871, Emma Dean gave birth to the Powells' only child, Mary Dean Powell in Salt Lake City, Utah. She was active in the Wimodaughsis, a national women's club in Washington, D.C., started by Anna Howard Shaw and Susan B. Anthony. Emma Dean Powell died on March 13, 1924, in Washington, D.C. She is buried along with her husband in Arlington National Cemetery.

Notes

References
 Powell, J.W. (1875). The Exploration of the Colorado River and Its Canyons. New York: Dover Press (reprint) .
 Ross, John F. (2018). The Promise of the Grand Canyon: John Wesley Powell's perilous journey and his vision for the American West. Viking. .
 Aton, James M. (2010). John Wesley Powell: His life and legacy. 
 Boas, F.; Powell, J.W. (1991) Introduction to Handbook of American Indian Languages plus Indian Linguistic Families of America North of Mexico.  University of Nebraska Press,  (double book volume).
 Darrah, William Culp, Ralph V. Chamberlin, and Charles Kelly. (2009). The Exploration of the Colorado River in 1869 and 1871–1872: Biographical Sketches and Original Documents of the First Powell Expedition of 1869 and the Second Powell Expedition of 1871–1872. University of Utah Press. .
 Dolnick, Edward (2002). Down the Great Unknown: John Wesley Powell's 1869 journey of discovery and tragedy through the Grand Canyon. Harper Perennial (paperback) .
 Dolnick, Edward (2001). Down the Great Unknown: John Wesley Powell's 1869 journey of discovery and tragedy through the Grand Canyon. (hardcover) HarperCollins Publishers .
 Ghiglieri, Michael P.; Bradley, George Y. (2003). First Through Grand Canyon: The secret journals & letters of the 1869 crew who explored the Green and Colorado Rivers. Puma Press (paperback) .
 Judd, Neil Merton (1967). The Bureau of American Ethnology: A partial history. Norman, OK: University of Oklahoma Press.
 Marston, Otis R. (2014). From Powell to Power: A recounting of the first one hundred river runners through the Grand Canyon, pp. 111–114. Flagstaff, Arizona: Vishnu Temple Press .
  Heacox, Kim; Kostyal, K.M.; Walker, Paul Robert (1 September 1999). Exploring the Great Rivers of North America. National Geographic Society (first ed.) , .
 Reisner, Marc (1993). Cadillac Desert: The American West and its disappearing water. Penguin Books (paperback) .
 Stegner, Wallace (1954). Beyond the Hundredth Meridian: John Wesley Powell and the second opening of the West. University of Nebraska Press (and other reprint editions) .
 
 
 Reisner, Marc (1986). "Cadillac Desert: the American West and its Disappearing Water".
 Powell, J.W. (1876). A Report on the Arid Regions of the United States, with a More Detailed Account of the Lands of Utah

External links

 Biographical sketch (1903) by Frederick S. Dellenbaugh
  NPS John Wesley Powell Photograph Index
 
 
 
 John Wesley Powell Student Research Conference at Illinois Wesleyan University
 John Wesley Powell Collection of Pueblo Pottery at Illinois Wesleyan University Ames Library
 Powell Museum, Page, Arizona
 John Wesley Powell River History Museum, Green River, Utah
 "John Wesley Powell"  by James M. Aton in the Western Writers Series Digital Editions at Boise State University
 "A Canyon Voyage, The Narrative of the Second Powell Expedition down the Green-Colorado River from Wyoming, and the Explorations on Land, in the Years 1871 and 1872" (1908) by Frederick Samuel Dellenbaugh at Project Gutenberg.
 
 Powell, J. W., In Fowler, D. D., & In Fowler, C. S. (1971). Anthropology of the Numa: John Wesley Powell's manuscripts on the Numic peoples of Western North America, 1868–1880. Washington: Smithsonian Institution Press; for sale by the Supt. of Docs., U.S. Govt. Print. Off..
 Fowler, D. D., Matley, J. F., & National Museum of Natural History (U.S.). (1979). Material culture of the Numa: The John Wesley Powell Collection, 1867–1880. Washington: Smithsonian Institution Press.
 John Wesley Powell artifact collections in the Department of Anthropology, National Museum of Natural History, Smithsonian Institution.

1834 births
1902 deaths
American explorers
Explorers of North America
Explorers of the United States
American geologists
American conservationists
Smithsonian Institution people
Illinois College alumni
Oberlin College alumni
People of Illinois in the American Civil War
Union Army officers
Early Grand Canyon river runners
People from Boone County, Illinois
Wheaton College (Illinois) alumni
Illinois Wesleyan University faculty
Illinois State University faculty
People from Mount Morris, New York
American people of English descent
Linguists from the United States
United States Geological Survey personnel
American civil servants
American amputees
National Geographic Society founders
Burials at Arlington National Cemetery
History of the Rocky Mountains
Activists from New York (state)
Linguists of Hokan languages
Members of the American Antiquarian Society
Members of the United States National Academy of Sciences
Linguists of indigenous languages of North America
Scientists with disabilities